The 1930 Western Kentucky State Teachers Hilltoppers football team represented Western Kentucky State Teachers College (now known as Western Kentucky University) in the 1930 college football season. They were led by first-year coach James Elam and team captain Paul "Burrhead" Vaughn. One of the highlights for this team was a victorious season ending trip to Miami. Rupert Cummings and Leroy Elrod were named to the All Kentucky Team.

Schedule

References

Western Kentucky State Teachers
Western Kentucky Hilltoppers football seasons
Western Kentucky State Teachers Hilltoppers football